Brachinus adustipennis is a species of ground beetle in the family Carabidae. It is found in the Caribbean Sea, Central America, and North America.

References

Further reading

External links

 

Brachininae
Articles created by Qbugbot
Beetles described in 1969
Beetles of North America